Kilpinen is a Finnish surname. Notable people with the surname include:

Erkki Kilpinen (born 1948), Finnish Nordic combined skier
Yrjö Kilpinen (1892–1959), Finnish composer

Finnish-language surnames